Ghonda Assembly constituency is one of the seventy Delhi assembly constituencies of Delhi in northern India.
Ghonda assembly constituency is a part of North East Delhi (Lok Sabha constituency).

Members of Legislative Assembly
Key

Election results

2020

2015

2013

2008 
  
Major Boundary Changes(Yamuna Vihar constituency merged with Ghonda)

2003

1998

1993

References

Assembly constituencies of Delhi
Delhi Legislative Assembly